The following is a partial list of stories from the collection Uji Shūi Monogatari written around the 13th century.  They are listed individually in order of their respective designation in the collection (volume # / story # in volume) followed by a short summary.  Note that some stories may have two parts.

Sources
Mills, D.E. A collection of tales from Uji: a study and translation of Uji shūi monogatari. Cambridge, University Press. 1970.
Tyler, Royall. Japanese Tales.  Pantheon Fairy Tale and Folklore Library: Pantheon Books, New York. 1987

References

Japanese fiction
13th-century writers